Breg ob Savi is a village on the right bank of the Sava River, just south of Kranj in the Upper Carniola region of Slovenia.

Name
Breg ob Savi was attested in historical sources as Rayn in 1464 and Rain in 1476. The name of the settlement was changed from Breg to Breg ob Savi in 1953.

Church

The church in the settlement is dedicated to the Mother of God. It is the parish church of the Parish of Kranj–Drulovka / Breg.

References

External links

Breg ob Savi on Geopedia

Populated places in the City Municipality of Kranj